The  (OQLF) is a public organization established on 24 March 1961, by the Liberal government of Jean Lesage.

History 

The creation of a "Board of the French language" was one of the recommendations of the Tremblay Royal Commission of Inquiry on Constitutional Problems which published its five-volume report in 1956. Such an institution was part of the list of 46 vows formulated by the Second Congress on the French Language in Canada held in Quebec City in 1937.

In 1961, the Act to establish the Department of Cultural Affairs was passed providing for the creation of the Office of the French Language (OLF). The organization had as its mission the assurance of the correct usage of French and enrichment of the spoken and written language. In 1969, the Act to promote the French language was passed. This law expanded the mandate of the office and introduced the notion of the right to work in French.

In 1974, the Official Language Act was passed aiming to strengthen the status and use of French in Quebec and gives the office a decisive role in the implementation of its provisions. In 1977, the Charter of the French Language was passed. The first mandatory language law, it incorporates several elements of the Official Language Act, which it broadens, and substantially enhances the status of the French language in Quebec.

Two new mandates, the handling of complaints and the monitoring of the linguistic situation, were then entrusted to the OQLF. The organization has also instituted two committees each chaired by a member of the Board: the Linguistic Officialization Committee and the Language Status Monitoring Committee.

Mission and powers 
Sections 159 to 164 of the Québec Charter of the French Language defines the mission and powers of the commission.:
 To define and conduct Quebec's policy pertaining to linguistic officialization, terminology and francization of public administration and businesses; (Section 159)
 To monitor the linguistic situation in Québec and to report thereon to the Minister at least every five years; (Section 160)
 To see to it that French is the normal and everyday language of work, communication, commerce and business in the civil administration and in enterprises; (Section 161)
 To assist and inform the civil administration, semipublic agencies, enterprises, associations and natural persons as regards the correction and enrichment of spoken and written French in Québec; (Section 162)
 To establish the research programmes needed for the application of the Act. (Section 163)
 To make agreements or take part in joint projects with any person or agency. (Section 164)

In 2004, the organization had a yearly budget of $17.8 million. In 2005-2006, the budget rose to $18.5 million, in 2007-2008 to $19.0 million and to $24.453 million in 2018-2019.

Members 

In July 2020, the OQLF's eight members, appointed by the government for a maximum of five years, were:

 Ginette Galarneau : Présidente-directrice générale (CEO)
 Alain Bélanger : Professeur agrégé au Centre Urbanisation Culture Société de l'Institut national de la recherche scientifique(INRS) (Associate Professor, Centre Urbanisation Culture Société, Institut national de la recherche scientifique)
 Denis Bolduc : Secrétaire général de la Fédération des travailleurs et travailleuses du Québec(FTQ) (Secretary General, Québec Federation of Labour)
 Juliette Champagne : Sous-ministre adjointe au Secrétariat à la promotion et à la valorisation de la langue française (Assistant Deputy Minister, Secrétariat à la promotion et à la valorisation de la langue française)
 François Côté : Avocat (Lawyer)
 Gilles Dulude : Président de Synergroupe Conseils en ressources humaines (2000) inc. (President, Synergroupe Conseils en ressources humaines (2000) Inc.)
 Chantal Gagnon : Professeure agrégée de traduction commerciale à l'Université de Montréal (Associate Professor of commercial translation at Université de Montréal)
 Tania Longpré : Enseignante en francisation, chargée de cours et doctorante en didactique des langues à l'Université du Québec à Montréal (Francization teacher, Lecturer and PhD student in language teaching at Université du Québec à Montréal)

Services 
Following its mandates, the OQLF offers the following services to the population of Quebec:

 General information service via toll free line, Web site and brochures;
 Francization services:
 Francization counselling (for businesses of 50 employees or more);
 Technical assistance relating to Francization of information technologies;
 Processing of complaints for non-respect of the law;
 Terminology and linguistics tools and services:
 The Grand dictionnaire terminologique;
 The Banque de dépannage linguistique;
 Personalized terminological and linguistic consultation;
 Publications of the OQLF:
 Le français au bureau, a book for the general public pertaining to administrative and commercial writing;
 Terminology works: dictionaries, lexicons addressed principally to specialists;
 Libraries: one in Montreal, the other in Quebec City;
 Evaluation of competence in French by candidates to professional orders of Quebec;

Awards 
Many distinctions are given by the OQLF to reward persons and organizations contributing to keeping French alive.

The OQLF rewards outstanding francization efforts by persons and organizations. For over 20 years, it has been awarding the Mérites du français au travail et dans le commerce (French Merits at work and in commerce).

Since 1999, in collaboration with the Union des artistes (UDA), the Union des écrivaines et des écrivains québécois (UNEQ) and the Société des auteurs de radio, télévision et cinéma (SARTEC), the OQLF awards the Mérites du français dans la culture (French Merits in culture).

Since 1999, supplanting the former Mérite de la langue française (French language Merit), it awards the Prix Camille-Laurin to underline a person's effort in promoting the usefulness of quality of French in his/her social milieu.

In collaboration with Québec Ministry of Immigration, it awards the Mérites en francisation des nouveaux arrivants (Merits in Francization of new immigrants). One is for a "non-francophone immigrant person", another for a "person working in the field on francization of immigrants", a "Community of institutional partner of francization", and a "business".

The president of the OQLF presides the Jury of the Dictée des Amériques (Dictée of the Americas), an international competition of French spelling created by Télé-Québec in 1994.

Complaints 
Quebec citizens who believe their right as consumers "to be informed and served in French" is not being respected can file a complaint to the OQLF which is responsible for processing these complaints. As per Section 168 of the Charter, the complaint must be written and contain the identity of the complainant. The Office does however ensure privacy of information as per the Act respecting Access to documents held by public bodies and the Protection of personal information. The OQLF does not have the power to send an agent unless it has received a complaint or a vote by the members of the OQLF.

The statistics compiled by the OQLF for 2005–2006 reveal that some 1306 complainants filed 3652 complaints. 1078 (29.5%) complaints were from the region of Montreal, 883 (24.2%) from the region of Outaouais, 386 (10.6%) from Montérégie. Section 51, the language of products (labelling, packaging, instructions manuals, directions, warranty certificates) (article 51) amounted to 43.0% of the total. 13.8% were for breaches of Section 52, language of catalogues, pamphlets, business directories, and 9.6% were for breaches of Sections 2 and 5, the language of service.

Between 1 April 2005 and 31 March 2006, the OQLF closed 2899 complaints. There were 797 resolved cases, 523 unfounded complaints, 430 where the product was ultimately retracted from the market, 199 complaints found to be out of order, 183 cases of translated products. For the year 2006, there were 127 infractions ranging from $250 to $5000.

Perception

The OQLF was created to enforce the everyday use of the French language in Quebec. The OQLF promoted the Quebec Charter of the French Language, and, prior to 1988, was responsible for enforcing a regulation whereby French was the only language authorized on outdoor commercial signage. After multiple successful legal challenges, the role of the OQLF has since changed to ensuring French is the "predominant" language, meaning at least twice the size of any and all other languages.

The OQLF has been referred to in English as 'tongue troopers'. The term "language police" was possibly first used by the American television show 60 Minutes, which ran an investigative report on Quebec language laws. Legally, the organization has no police powers, instead relying on the threat of fines or the withholding of the company's "francisation certificate" as enforcement techniques.

According to the statistics of the OQLF, 95% of all complaints by citizens which are judged to be valid are resolved without resorting to legal sanction. In an average year, the OQLF receives between 3000 and 4000 complaints from citizens. Forty to fifty percent of these complaints have to do with commercial products for which there is no available French manual or packaging, 25% have to do with signage in stores, 10% with websites and 5% with the language of service.
 
The majority of criticism directed at the OQLF is due to a perceived overzealous nature in the application of its mandate. Some recent examples include:
 Citing a Montreal restaurant for having a small "recommended on Tripadvisor" sticker in the bottom corner of a window. The complaint was that the sticker was in English and there was no French version displayed.
 Issuing a letter of complaint to the owner of a board game store for mostly selling board games with English packaging, though French versions did not exist for the majority of the games in question.
 Demanding the town of St. Lazare remove "Welcome" from the town's welcome signs, leaving only the French version, "Vous accueille", though one-third of the town's residents were native English speakers. The town instead opted to remove all words from the welcome sign.
 Citing a small business in Chelsea for replying in English to English comments on the store's Facebook page without writing a second, French version of the response.
 Citing a restaurant that specializes in grilled cheese for having "Grilled cheese" on their sign rather than the French version "sandwich au fromage fondu".
 Forcing a hospital in the Gaspé region of Quebec to remove all bilingual signage, despite the presence of a large English speaking population.
Rejecting a complaint against OQLF because the complaint was written in English instead of French. Quebec Ombudsman later overruled OQLF's decision, pointing out under Quebec's French-language charter, government agencies can respond to citizens in 'a language other than French'.

One case that gained international attention in 2013 was dubbed "Pastagate", in which the OQLF cited an Italian restaurant for using the word "Pasta" on its menu instead of the French word "pâtes". After receiving negative coverage throughout the world including the US and Europe, the OQLF eventually backed down, admitting to being "overzealous" and stating they will perform a review of the way these types of complaints are handled.

Today 
Originally, the Charter of the French Language (Bill 101) required that all commercial signage be in French and no other language. In 1988 Ford v. Quebec the Supreme Court of Canada ruled this was against the Canadian Charter of Rights and Freedoms. After massive protests in support of the legislation, the Bourassa Government invoked section Thirty-three of the Canadian Charter of Rights and Freedoms (the notwithstanding clause), allowing the language laws to override the rights and freedoms charter for a period of five years, after which they would be reviewed.

In 1993, the United Nations Human Rights Committee concluded in Ballantyne, Davidson, McIntyre v. Canada that it was outside of the Quebec government's jurisdiction to limit freedom of expression in a language of the person's choice. (See Legal dispute over Quebec's language policy.) Also in 1993, but not due to the UNHR ruling, Quebec reviewed the law and modified its language regulations to require that French be markedly predominant on exterior business signs, as suggested by the Supreme Court of Canada ruling in the case of Ford v. Quebec.

See also 
 Académie française of France, arbiter of the French language in France
 Charter of the French Language
 Ford v. Quebec (Attorney General) (1988), (2 S.C.R. 90)
 Legal dispute over Quebec's language policy
 Linguistic prescription
 Pastagate
 Politics of Quebec
 History of Quebec French

References

External links 

 Office québécois de la langue française 
OQLF webpage English content 
 Bill 101 Background
 Quebec Statutes and Regulations

Quebec French
Language regulators
Culture of Quebec
Quebec government departments and agencies
Organizations based in Montreal
Quebec language policy
1961 establishments in Quebec
Francophonie